Pike Township is one of the twelve townships of Fulton County, Ohio, United States. As of the 2010 census the population was 1,854.

Geography
Located in the central part of the county, it borders the following townships:
Royalton Township – north
Amboy Township – northeast corner
Fulton Township – east
Swan Creek Township – southeast corner
York Township – south
Clinton Township – southwest corner
Dover Township – west
Chesterfield Township – northwest

It is one of only two townships in the county without a border on another county.

The unincorporated community of Winameg is in Pike Township, while Advance lies on the western border, at the junction with Dover and Chesterfield Townships.

Name and history
It is one of eight Pike Townships statewide.

Government
The township is governed by a three-member board of trustees, who are elected in November of odd-numbered years to a four-year term beginning on the following January 1. Two are elected in the year after the presidential election and one is elected in the year before it. There is also an elected township fiscal officer, who serves a four-year term beginning on April 1 of the year after the election, which is held in November of the year before the presidential election. Vacancies in the fiscal officership or on the board of trustees are filled by the remaining trustees.

References

External links
County website

Townships in Fulton County, Ohio
Townships in Ohio